Pullikkanam is a village in Peerumedu Taluk, Idukki district in Kerala, India,  from the town of Thodupuzha.

Orchid garden 
The  garden of orchids, known as Kerala's first orchid garden, is in Kolahalamedu near Pullikkanam in Vagamon.  This unique garden was opened to the public by mid-January 2014. The garden is in the land under Kerala Forest Development Corporation. The garden has some rare varieties of orchids that are found in the Western Ghats.

Pullikkanam Tea Estate 
The Pullikkanam Estate is owned by Kochi-based Cochin-Malabar Estates and Industries Limited. Company was set up 85 years ago and employs a number of people.

References 

Villages in Idukki district